The Dark Queen of Krynn is the third in a three-part series of Dragonlance Advanced Dungeons & Dragons "Gold Box" role-playing video games. The game was released in 1992.

Plot
At the beginning of the game, the characters are summoned by General Laurana to investigate rumors of evil creatures threatening the city of Caergoth. The heroes are quickly led to travel to another distant continent of Krynn, Taladas, where the forces of evil are hatching their plans.

Gameplay
To play The Dark Queen of Krynn, the player generates a party of six characters. The gameplay basics are identical to all games in the series. Characters can also be transferred from Death Knights of Krynn.

The game was more combat heavy than the previous releases in the series and there was less time spent in exploration mode. While the tone of the release was epic in scale, ultimately leading to an encounter with the dark goddess Takhisis, the game was marred by significant bugs.

Game differences
The Dark Queen of Krynn is similar to its predecessors in terms of gameplay, though graphics were improved, as the PC and Macintosh version of the game could now display 256 colors. The Amiga version still uses 32 colors.

A departure from many of the prior titles (including the Forgotten Realms games) is that the choice of the character's combat icon is restricted. Instead of choosing parts and colors, a player has some pre-drawn icons which can be selected.

Unlike its predecessors, the arrow keys can not be used to select menu options. Those options are selected using hotkeys or clicking on the menu option with the mouse.

Reception
SSI sold 40,640 copies of The Dark Queen of Krynn. Scorpia of Computer Gaming World in 1992 welcomed the improvements to previous Gold Box games' gameplay, but stated that otherwise "there is very little to like about Dark Queen of Krynn. Playability suffers from a couple of insidious bugs, poor design, and a great deal of gratuitous damage". She concluded that it was "the nadir of the gold box games ... a frustrating exercise in survival that only the most devoted hack'n'slashers would want to experience". In 1993 Scorpia said that it was the "conclusion of the Krynn series, and none too soon ... Only for the dedicated Gold Box fan". The New Straits Times called the game "recycled trash".

According to GameSpy, "Dark Queen of Krynn was a little bit hard to love, but the level to which it incorporated elements of the DragonLance universe made it worth coping, for a great many fans".

References

External links
 
 

1992 video games
Amiga games
Classic Mac OS games
DOS games
Dragonlance video games
Games commercially released with DOSBox
Gold Box
Role-playing video games
Strategic Simulations games
Tactical role-playing video games
Video games developed in the United States
Video games featuring protagonists of selectable gender
Video games with oblique graphics
Video games scored by George Sanger